Stavenice is a municipality and village in Šumperk District in the Olomouc Region of the Czech Republic. It has about 100 inhabitants.

History
The first written mention of Stavenice is from 1273.

References

Villages in Šumperk District